The following table lists the coal mines in the United States that produced at least 4,000,000 short tons of coal.

According to the U.S. Energy Information Administration (EIA), there were 853 coal mines in the U.S. in 2015, producing a total of 896,941,000 short tons of coal.

See also
Coal mining in the United States
 List of coal mines in Australia
 List of coal mines in Canada

References

 
Coal
United States